Muras is a municipality in the province of Lugo, part of the autonomous community of Galicia, in northwestern Spain. Muras belongs to the comarca of Terra Chá.

References

Municipalities in the Province of Lugo